"SexBeat" is a song by American musicians Usher, Lil Jon, and Ludacris, released on April 10, 2020, as the second single from Usher's upcoming ninth studio album Confessions 2. It is the third song between the trio, following "Yeah!" and "Lovers and Friends". Produced by Jon, the song was written by the artists alongside Jermaine Dupri and Antoine Harris.

Background and release 
On April 4, 2020, T-Pain and Lil Jon appeared on Swizz Beatz and Timbaland's Instagram Live songwriting battle show #VERZUZ that was watched by over 275,000 viewers. At the end of the battle Lil Jon played never-before-heard song called "SexBeat". 

During the Live, Lil Jon revealed that the song was recorded over two years ago. Lil Jon also revealed that he had to beg Usher to allow him to play it. It was officially released for digital download and streaming on April 11, 2020.

Credits and personnel
Credits adapted from Tidal.

 Usher – vocals, songwriter
 Ludacris – vocals, songwriter
  Lil Jon - vocals, songwriter, producer, mixing engineer, programmer 
 Jermaine Dupri – songwriter
 Antoine Harris - songwriter
 Bobby Ross Avila - songwriter, piano, guitars
 Kronic - songwriter, misc. producer 
 Colin Leonard – mastering engineer
 Bill Zimmerman – assistant engineer
 Phil Tan – mixing engineer, misc. producer 
 Ben "Bengineer" Chang - recording engineer, vocal producer

Charts

References

2020 songs
Usher (musician) songs
Lil Jon songs
Ludacris songs
RCA Records singles
Songs written by Usher (musician)
Songs written by Jermaine Dupri
Song recordings produced by Lil Jon
Songs written by Ludacris
Songs written by Lil Jon